Zapped Again! is a 1990 American direct-to-video science fiction comedy film directed by Doug Campbell and starring Todd Eric Andrews and Kelli Williams. It is a sequel to Zapped! (1982).

Plot

Kevin Matthews (Todd Eric Andrews), becomes a new pupil at Ralph Waldo Emerson High School. Rejected by the trendy Key Club, he instead joins the Science Club. There he accidentally discovers a number of vials that were made by former student Barney Springboro (from the original film) behind a hidden panel in the lab.

After drinking the contents, Kevin develops psychokinetic powers. He amuses himself by lifting girls' dresses and humiliating the Key Club jocks, becoming popular in the process. However, the Key Club plots a cruel revenge.

Cast

Reception
On Rotten Tomatoes the film has an approval rating of 0% based on reviews from 5 critics.

References

External links
 
 

1990 direct-to-video films
1990s sex comedy films
American science fiction comedy films
American independent films
American parody films
American sex comedy films
American teen comedy films
1990s English-language films
Direct-to-video sequel films
ITC Entertainment films
Films about telekinesis
Teen sex comedy films
1990 comedy films
1990 independent films
1990 films
1990s American films